Komar is a Polish coat of arms. It was used by several szlachta families in the times of the Polish–Lithuanian Commonwealth.

History

Blazon

See also
 Polish heraldry
 Heraldry
 Coat of arms

Polish coats of arms